Jenny Rivera may refer to:

 Jenni Rivera (1969–2012), Mexican-American singer-songwriter, actress, television producer and entrepreneur
 Jenny Rivera (judge) (born 1960), judge on the New York State Court of Appeals